MBRWizard is a Master Boot Record (MBR) management application for x86 and x86-64 based computers.  As the use of disk imaging applications for backup and operating system deployment began to increase, as well as many users beginning to experiment with dual-booting Linux on existing Windows machines, key entries in the MBR were often changed or corrupted, rendering the machine unbootable.  MBRWizard was designed to allow the user to reverse or repair these unwanted, destructive changes to the MBR, effectively enabling the computer to once again boot properly.

Summary
Originally developed in 1999 for internal use, it was continually updated and eventually released as freeware to the public in March 2003.  Initial functionality was designed to sort partition table entries caused by effects of disk imaging, but quickly evolved to include the backup and recovery of the entire MBR, repair of a corrupt Windows MBR record, as well as direct modification of the disk signature.  Additional functionality was added to allow partitions to be activated, hidden, and deleted.  Later options were added to include disk wipe functionality, shutdown/reboot of the machine, mount/dismount of Windows volumes, and a staging byte utilized to maintain status between reboots.

Designed as a cross-platform application from the beginning, MBRWizard is noted as being very flexible as it can be implemented natively on most PC operating systems.  In addition to the freeware MBRWizard CLI version, MBRWizard Suite 3.0 was released in 2010 as a commercial product, featuring a new graphical interface, and the ability to create custom WinPE boot environments for offline repair and recovery.

Supported operating systems
 DOS
 Win9x
 Windows 8.1, Windows Server 2008 R2, Windows 7, 2008, Vista, 2003, XP, 2000, NT4
 WinPE 1.x, 2.x, 3.x
 BartPE
 Linux

References

External links
 

Booting
BIOS
C++ software